Lir (also Romanized as Līr) is a village in Masal Rural District, in the Central District of Masal County, Gilan Province, Iran. At the 2006 census, its population was 44, in 11 families.

References 

Populated places in Masal County